Sergei Sergeyevich Yuvenko (born 4 February 1988) is a Russian professional football player. He plays for FC Dorozhnik Kamenka.

Club career
He played in the Russian Football National League for FC Mordovia Saransk in 2007.

External links
 Career summary by Sportbox
 

1988 births
Living people
Russian footballers
Association football forwards
FC Mordovia Saransk players